{{Automatic taxobox
| taxon = Pantoea
| authority = Gavini et al. 1989
|image= Pantoea piersonii, formerly Kalamiella piersonii NRRL B-65522 (Type Strain).jpg
|image_caption= Pantoea piersonii, formerly Kalamiella piersonii'’ on agar plate
| type_species = Pantoea agglomerans| subdivision_ranks = Species
| subdivision =P. agglomerans P. ananatis P. citrea P. dispersa P. punctata P. stewartii P. terrea P. septica P. vagans}}Pantoea is a genus of Gram-negative bacteria of the family Erwiniaceae, recently separated from the genus Enterobacter. This genus includes at least 20 species. Pantoea bacteria are yellow pigmented, ferment lactose, are motile, and form mucoid colonies. Some species show quorum sensing ability that could drive different gene expression, hence controlling certain physiological activities. Levan polysaccharide produced by Pantoea agglomerans ZMR7 was reported to decrease the viability of rhabdomyosarcoma (RD) and breast cancer (MDA) cells compared with untreated cancer cells. In addition, it has high antiparasitic activity against the promastigote of Leishmania tropica.

 Species Pantoea agglomerans is the most common Pantoea species recovered from humans and an opportunistic pathogen associated with contaminated catheters and penetrating trauma. It was formerly known as Erwinia herbicola or Enterobacter agglomerans. Pantoea allii Pantoea ananatis Pantoea anthophila Pantoea deleyi Pantoea dispersa Pantoea eucalyptii Pantoea stewartii''

References

Bacteria genera
Enterobacterales